Johan Jacob Bruun (30 November 1715 – 4 January 1789) was a Danish painter. Often working in gouaches, he is most known for his topographic prospects which herald the development of a Danish landscape painting.

Biography
He was born in Slagelse in 1715. He started in an apprenticeship under the painter Johan Herman Coning and taught miniature painting. Between 1737 and 1769 he executed more than 1,000 gouaches, watercolours and touch drawings depicting towns, castles and other motives.

He assisted with Lauritz de Thurah's Hafnia Hodierna (1746) and Den Danske Vitruvius (1746–49). When his contributions were not included in Frederick V's Atlas, he received permission and economic support to publish them in Novus Atlas Daniæ of which only one volume appeared. A number of Bruun's works have been preserved, including at Rosenborg Castle, Frederiksborg Castle, Øregaard Museum and Museum of Copenhagen.

Among his known works are portraits of King Christian VI and Queen Consort Sophia Magdalen (1737, Rosenborg Castle, after Johann Salomon Wahl), Poul Løvenørn (after A. Brünniche) and Niels Trolle (1741, Frederiksborg Castle), Ove Gjedde and Oluf Parsberg (1741, both Ledreborg Castle).

Towards the end of his life he turned blind and he died in Hillerød in 1789.

Gallery

See also

 Art of Denmark
 List of Danish painters

References

External links
 En maritim miniature fra 1739
 Illustrations
 Roskilde prospect
 Danmarks Slotte, 24 illustrations

Danish Baroque painters
18th-century Danish painters
18th-century male artists
Danish male painters
People from Slagelse
1715 births
1789 deaths